Tree marriage is a form of symbolic marriage between a human and a tree that is said to be infused with supernatural life.

It can be a form of proxy marriage in which a bachelor marries a tree and becomes treated as a widower when the tree is felled, a status required in some cultures to allow him to marry a widow.

Tree marriage was once widespread in India among some cults around beliefs that trees contain hidden or sacred power to cure or to enhance fertility or that they contain the souls of ancestors or of the unborn.

In 2007, Aishwarya Rai announced that she is marrying a tree.

In Mexico, it was reported that women are marrying trees in protest of logging.

References

Types of marriage
Trees
Marriage in India
Marriage, unions and partnerships in Mexico